James Kevin Rankin (born May 28, 1964) is a Canadian country and folk artist. A member of The Rankin Family, Rankin has also released seven solo albums: Song Dog (2001), Handmade (2003), Edge of Day (2007), Forget About the World (2011), Tinsel Town (2012), Back Road Paradise (2014) and Moving East (2018). Rankin's solo and Rankin Family awards include 5 Junos, 27 East Coast Music Awards, 9 SOCAN top radio play Awards, 7 Canadian Country Music Awards, 2 Music NS Awards, and 2 Canadian Radio Music Awards.

Early years
Rankin was born in 1964 in Mabou, Nova Scotia. He grew up as part of a musical family that would entertain the neighbors every third weekend as part of the local céilidh. This group became known as The Rankin Family and went on to achieve international success in the 1990s as they brought their well-loved mix of Cape Breton traditional music, roots and pop to the rest of the world.

Musical career

2001–2002: Song Dog
After embarking on a solo career, Rankin released his debut album, Song Dog in August 2001. Three singles were released from the album, "Followed Her Around", "Midnight Angel", and "Wasted". "Followed Her Around" was named the "Single of the Year" award at the SOCAN Awards in 2002. The song also was named "Single of the Year" and "Video of the Year" from the East Coast Music Association. Song Dog was named "Album of the Year" at the Canadian Country Music Awards and at the East Coast Music Awards. In 2003, "Midnight Angel" was named "Single of the Year" and Rankin was named SOCAN Songwriter of the Year at the East Coast Music Awards.

2003–2004: Handmade
Handmade was released in September 2003 and produced three singles, "Morning Bound Train", "Butterfly", and "California Dreamer". It was named "Album of the Year" and "Roots/Traditional Solo Recording of the Year" at the East Coast Music Awards in 2003. "Morning Bound Train" was named "Single of the Year" and Rankin was named SOCAN Songwriter of the Year at the ECMA's. "Butterfly" was named "Single of the Year" and "Video of the Year" at the ECMA's in 2005. Rankin also received SOCAN Songwriter of the Year for the song.

2006–2007: Edge of Day
After a brief hiatus, Edge of Day was released in May 2007 and produced three singles, "Slipping Away", "Got to Leave Louisiana", and "Still Lovers Now". In 2008, Rankin was named Songwriter of the Year at the Canadian Country Music Awards for the song, "First Time in a Long Time" with Deric Ruttan. At the East Coast Music Awards, Edge of Day was named Country Recording of the Year, FACTOR Recording of the Year and Konica Minolta Male Solo Recording of the Year. He was also awarded SOCAN Songwriter of the Year for the song, "Slipping Away".

2011–2012: Forget About the World
Forget About the World was released in April 2011 and has released three singles, "Here in My Heart", "I'm Just Saying" and "The Hurtin' Part". Forget About the World was nominated fore Juno for Country Recording of the Year and a record breaking 8 ECMAs including: Recording of the Year, Entertainer of the Year, Song of the Year, Video of the Year, Country Album of the Year, Video of the Year and Songwriter of the Year. In September 2011, Rankin won a CCMA for "Roots Artist of the Year" and in November 2011 he won the Music Nova Scotia "SOCAN Songwriter of the Year" Award as well as a SOCAN top radio play award for his song "Up All Night". The accolades continued in December with Rankin's fans naming him one of CBC Radio's Top 50 Artists of 2011. Rankin's song "Here in My Heart" was named the number one Canadian Country song of 2011 by Top Country. Rankin won "Roots Artist of the Year" for the second year in a row in September 2012.

2012–2013: Tinsel Town
The Christmas themed album Tinsel Town was released on November 6, 2012. Rankin embarked on Cross-Canada tours in support of the effort in November and December 2012 and 2013. The album, produced by Bill Bell (Jason Mraz, Tom Cochrane), contains four original songs: "Tinseltown", "December", "Boogie Woogie Christmas" and "Don't Wanna Say Goodbye to Christmas". The CD package has a unique feature that allows it to be sent in the mail as a Christmas card.

2014–present: Back Road Paradise and Moving East
Rankin  released his sixth full-length album, Back Road Paradise, produced by Bill Bell, on April 1, 2014. Back Road Paradise features 12 brand-new Rankin compositions, including lead-off single "Cool Car" and duets with Grammy winner and bluegrass icon Alison Krauss, as well as Blue Rodeo’s Jim Cuddy. After living and working in Nashville for seven years, Rankin returned to his home province of Nova Scotia. His latest album, Moving East, was produced by Joel Plaskett and was issued in September 2018. It is his first album for True North Records.

Discography

Albums

Singles

Other charted songs

Music videos

Awards and nominations

References

External links
Official Site

1964 births
Canadian country singer-songwriters
Canadian folk singer-songwriters
Canadian male singer-songwriters
Living people
Musicians from Nova Scotia
People from Inverness County, Nova Scotia